The Toyota Yaris Verso is a mini MPV produced by Toyota using the Yaris nameplate from August 1999 to October 2005. It is built on the same NBC platform as the XP10 series Yaris/Vitz/Echo. The FunCargo/Yaris Verso was replaced in Japan and Europe by the Ractis and Verso-S, respectively.

Overview 
The concept form of the car was introduced in 1997 at the 32nd Tokyo Motor Show. Unlike the bB, which is also based on the Yaris, the design has a strong intonation in line with European tastes at that time. The wheelbase is  longer than the Yaris.

The Yaris Verso adopted a center gauge layout on the instrument panel, and along with the Platz released at the same time, ISOFIX-compatible rear seats were standard equipment on all models from the beginning. The rear seat has an underfloor and forward storage function, making it easy to set up a large luggage compartment. It has the largest cabin volume and storage space of any compact car at the time, as things such as bicycles and large cross bikes can be stored using the standard hooks. Utilizing this volume, it has also been used for camping purposes and as a nursing and welfare vehicle that allows easy access for wheelchair users. It is also often used as a taxi, especially in large Japanese cities.

The car was available with 1.3- and 1.5-litre petrol engines and in 2001, a 1.4-litre D-4D diesel version was introduced. In Japan, there was also a four-wheel drive version of the 1.5-litre model (NCP25). All vehicles were equipped with a four-speed automatic transmission there. Additionally, Steer Shiftmatic was standard equipment on the G trim level. The car received the 20th 1999-2000 Japan Car of the Year along with the Vitz and the Platz.

In Japan, there were 16 colors at the beginning of the car's introduction, 18 colors for the facelift model (including the Active Two-Tone specification vehicles), and the interior color comes only in Shadow Gray and French Turquoise in the pre-facelift model and black in the facelift model.

Toyota Modellista International sold a limited edition of 350 "VF130" special edition cars.

In some markets, a two-seater van with stripped equipment was also available.

Timeline (Japanese market) 

 October 1997: Reference exhibit at the 32nd Tokyo Motor Show.
 30 August 1999: The FunCargo was announced and released to the Japanese market.
 2000:
 January: Partially improved. Rear seat headrests are standard equipment on all models.
 August: Partially improved. Green Pearl Mica is added as a body color.
 December: Partially improved. ABS with EBD is standard equipment on all models.
 2001:
 January: Partially improved. The special "Maziora" option is available for the "G" and "X" models.
 August: Partially improved. The Super White II body color has changed to a regular white.
 8 August 2002: Minor change.
 For the interior, the instrument panel design and overall color tone of the car have been changed, and for the exterior, the front grille, headlights, bumpers, rear combination lamps, etc. have been changed. In addition, the "Pair Bench Version" and "Rear Living Version" have been added to the "G" and "X".
 June 2003: Partially improved. The "HID Selection" is added to the "X".
 February 2004: Partially changed.
 September 2005: End of production. After that, only the remaining vehicle stock would be sold.
 October 2005: End of sale. The de facto successor is the Toyota Ractis.

Reception 
Most reviews in the United Kingdom, where the car has since been replaced by the Verso-S, have praised the space and the driving characteristics whilst passing adverse comment on the car's appearance. The vehicle earned the nickname of "ice cream van" there for its boxy appearance and shape.

Gallery

References 

Yaris Verso
Cars introduced in 1999
2000s cars
Mini MPVs
Front-wheel-drive vehicles
All-wheel-drive vehicles